Marshak, Marschak or Marshek is a surname of Jewish (eastern Ashkenazic) origin. It's a contraction of Our teacher rebe Shmuel Kaidanover.
 
 Boris Marshak (1933–2006), Russian archaeologist
 Jacob Marschak (1898–1977), American economist
 Robert Marshak (1916–1992), American physicist
 Samuil Marshak (1887–1964), Russian writer, translator and children's poet
 Archie Marshek

See also
 
Marsak
Marshak, Iran, a village

German-language surnames
Germanic-language surnames
Surnames of German origin